DZAR (1026 AM) Sonshine Radio is a radio station owned and operated by Sonshine Media Network International thru Swara Sug Media Corporation in the Philippines. Along with its co-flagship DXRD 711 Davao, it is the flagship station of the Sonshine Radio network. The station's studio is located on the 3rd Floor, ACQ Tower (formerly Jacinta Building I/NBC Tower), Santa Rita St. cor. EDSA, Brgy. Guadalupe Nuevo, Makati, and its transmitter is located along M. Sioson St., Brgy. Dampalit, Malabon. This station operates Monday to Saturday from 4:00 AM to 12:00 MN and Sunday from 5:00 AM to 12:00 MN.

History
The station was established in August 1972 under the ownership of Hypersonic Broadcasting Center. It carried the call letters DZXX under 1000 kHz. However, it closed shop by the time Martial Law was declared. On February 1, 1973, it went back on the air. In 1975, it changed its call letters to DWXX (Double X) and switched to a news and music format. DWXX closed shop on April 15, 1987. On May 10, 1987, Nation Broadcasting Corporation took over the frequency under the call letters DZAM, later known as DZAM Radyo Commando. During that period, the station operated with 10 kW output, and it featured a uniform network type full-service format (a.k.a. TV-on-radio format), consisting of news, and well-balanced mix of talk, music and entertainment programming for listeners of all ages; the live coverage of PBA games were also aired here during that time.

In 1998, after NBC was acquired by PLDT's MediaQuest Holdings from the consortium led by the Yabut family and real estate magnate Manny Villar, DZAM later changed its callsign as DZAR and relaunched as Angel Radyo, with an upgraded 25 kW signal, followed by the switch to news and talkback format. Some of the personalities who worked for Angel Radyo were TV personalities Boy Abunda, Ricky Carandang, TG Kintanar, Gerry Geronimo, Angelique Lazo, Bernadette Sembrano, Gina dela Vega-Cruz, showbiz columnist Jobert Sucaldito, columnist Rina Jimenez-David, Fernan Emberga, Noli Eala and Tim Orbos.

On January 29, 2005, international televangelist Pastor Apollo C. Quiboloy acquired all of NBC's AM stations under the Swara Sug Media Corporation's ownership. This, in turn, gave birth to Sonshine Radio. At that time its studios moved from NBC Tower/Jacinta Building in EDSA, Guadalupe, Makati to Jollibee Plaza Building in Ortigas Center, Pasig, and finally upgraded to its current 50 kW output, with its news, talk and religious programming.

Its 50,000-watt broadcast signal is heard in its territorial limits (Metro Manila). It is the only Philippine station listened to all over the world live via satellite through Globecast and through the Internet at its website, thus the tag "Dinig sa buong mundo" (Heard all over the world).

In 2012, DZAR studios moved back from Jollibee Plaza Building in Ortigas Center, Pasig to the new home ACQ Tower (formerly NBC Tower/Jacinta Building) in EDSA, Guadalupe, Makati.

On November 21, 2022, the station successfully began test broadcast on digital terrestrial television via SMNI subchannel 39.03 in Metro Manila. It comes as the station went off the air on AM radio for a period of time to give way to the transfer of its transmitter to an undisclosed area for better coverage.

Notable anchors

Current
 Pastor Apollo C. Quiboloy
 Juan Ponce Enrile

Former
 Aljo Bendijo (moved on PTV 4 and Radyo Pilipinas 1 738)
 Mike Defensor
 Lucy Torres-Gomez
 R. J. Nieto

References

External links
DZAR website
SMNI NEWS CHANNEL Website 

Radio stations in Metro Manila
Christian radio stations in the Philippines
Sonshine Media Network International
Radio stations established in 1972